Lisa Dawn Lougheed (born September 9, 1968) is a Canadian former singer, dancer, voice actress, and songwriter. She is likely best known for her role in the animated television series The Raccoons, where she performed for the soundtrack and voiced Lisa Raccoon.

Early life
Lougheed was born to mixed race parents; her father is a Scottish-Irish mix from Northern Ontario and her mother is a Black Nova Scotian with ties to North Preston and Guysborough. Lougheed's peers often mistook her mother for a maid.

Lougheed started tap dancing at three years old. She was a dance major at the Etobicoke School of the Arts as a teenager, where she learned ballet, modern dance, and highland dancing. While still in high-school, Lougheed spent three summers as a lead vocalist and dancer in musical revue style shows at Canada's Wonderland, where she sang such solo numbers as "Home" from The Wiz and "Le Jazz Hot!" from Victor/Victoria.

Career

1987-1989: The Raccoons and Evergreen Nights 
While still a teenager, Lougheed received a job as a singer and voice actress for The Raccoons. She was hired when Kevin Gillis, the show's creator, was on a Canada-wide search for a new singer.

Evergreen Nights, Lougheed's debut album, consisted of songs from The Raccoons. It was released in Canada under CBC Records in late 1987 and released in Europe in mid-1988. Half of the songs were recorded while Lougheed had a cold. A limited number of copies were released at the time, but the album was reissued on vinyl in 2019 by Return To Analog Records. Lougheed did not know Evergreen Nights was going to be released as an album because she thought the songs were only being used for the show.

Lougheed was a cast member for Youth Beat, an anti-drug campaign by Bell Canada that performed in at least twenty Ontario cities during 1989. She joined after receiving a phone call from an estranged female friend with a cocaine addiction; Lougheed's friend was in the hospital, $10,000 in debt, and would commit crimes to fund her addiction. While touring with Youth Beat, Lougheed worked as a clothing store manager and sang commercial jingles. She was also working on a demo tape and trying to find a contract with a music company.

Lougheed performed in Japan as a backup vocalist for Sheree Jeacocke.

1990-1992: World Love 
Lougheed decided to name her second album World Love in August 1990, when the Gulf War had begun. She started recording in the summer of 1991 after signing a contract with Sony Music Canada and released World Love on March 3, 1992 with Warner Music Canada. It was Lougheed's first album to contain songs she co-wrote, which was nine out of the ten tracks.

World Love was intended to have an optimistic message and say "you have the power to make changes and to be nice to other people that you meet." The third track on her album, "Change Takes Time," was inspired by a newspaper story about a homeless man who risked his life to save a family from a burning building.

In May 1992, Lougheed was an opening act for En Vogue at the Kingswood Music Theatre; a performer at the Live Unity 92 concert in Toronto; and a participant in the Hospital for Sick Children telethon. She also performed for the Canada Day celebration at Ontario Place and the Niagara Falls' New Year's Eve show. The latter event was aired on CJOH-DT and hosted by Nerene Virgin, Ken Shaw, and Kathie Donovan. It also included Glass Tiger and Prescott-Brown.

"Love Vibe," the fourth song on Lougheed's World Love album, was briefly played on "Graduation Day," episode five in season three of Northwood.

1993-1994: Peace + Harmony 
Peace + Harmony, Lougheed's third album, was released in August 1993. It was recorded in Toronto, New York City, Chicago, and New Jersey. Lougheed collaborated with seven different writers and producers, including Mike "The Hitman" Wilson, David Morales, Christopher Max,  Paul Scott, and Shank Thompson. Lougheed co-wrote 24 songs with twelve different writers in the span of two weeks, but the album only had ten tracks. Lougheed toured across Canada to promote her album, performing in the cities of Saskatoon, Calgary, Edmonton, Surrey, and Vancouver. Lougheed performed again at Niagara Falls' New Year's Eve show in 1993 with George Fox and Colin James.

In January 1994, Lougheed performed "Won't Give Up My Music" at AidScare, AidsCare; a CBC hosted event that was aimed at teenagers to raise awareness of AIDS and promote safe sex. Jonathan Torrens was the event's host. Additional show members were Sue Johanson, Suzie Landolphi, Snow, The Vacant Lot, and Corky and the Juice Pigs.

Lougheed was also a judge for the YTV Vocal Spotlight in April 1994. She performed at Niagara Falls' New Year's Eve show for the last time, this time alongside Blue Rodeo and Ashley MacIsaac. Ken Shaw returned as a host and with him was Beverly Thomson and Howard Glassman.

Lougheed has presumably since left the music industry. Her most recently credited vocal work was with Celine Dion and R. Kelly.

Discography and filmography

Albums

Credited songs

Singles and EPs

Television appearances

Charted songs

Nominations and awards

References

External links 

 Evergreen Nights archived on the Wayback Machine
 

1968 births
Actresses from Toronto
Canadian dance musicians
Canadian women pop singers
Canadian voice actresses
Living people
Musicians from Toronto
People from Etobicoke
20th-century Black Canadian women singers
Black Nova Scotians
Canadian people of Scottish descent
Canadian people of Irish descent